Shri Gangajali Education Society (SGES), established in 1994, provides education in the fields of arts, sciences, engineering, management, pharmaceuticals, nursing and education (B.Ed/M.Ed). It is situated in Bhilai, Chhattisgarh. The society runs twelve institutions, known collectively as the Shri Shankaracharya Group.

Institutions
The following institutions are managed by the society.

Shri Shankaracharya Technical Campus
Shri Shankaracharya College of Engineering and Technology, Bhilai
 Shri Shankaracharya Institute of Medical Sciences, Bhilai
Shri Shankaracharya Engineering College, Bhilai
Shri Shankaracharya Institute of Technology & Management, Bhilai
Shri Shankaracharya Mahavidyalaya, Junwani, Bhilai
Shri Shankaracharya Institute of Pharmaceutical Science, Bhilai
Swami Swaroopanand Institute of Education, Bhilai
Shri Shankaracharya College of Nursing, Bhilai
Shri Shankaracharya Vidyalaya, Hudco, Bhilai
Jagadguru Shankaracharya College of Education, Bhilai
Shri Shankaracharya Mahavidyalaya, Bhilai
Shri Shankaracharya Vidyalaya, Sector 6, Bhilai
Shri Shankaracharya Institute of Professional Management and Technology, Raipur

Adi Shri Shankaracharya Welfare Society

Adi Shri Shankaracharya Welfare Society, originally called Adi Shankaracharya, was established in 2012 by SGES with the aim of facilitating charitable, social, cultural, educational, vocational and economic development. As a pre-establishment activity, the society organized a program to train primary school students about computer education in 2010.

References

External links

 

Education in Bhilai
Education in Chhattisgarh
Engineering colleges in Chhattisgarh
Educational organisations based in India